Kuhjavere is a village in Põhja-Sakala Parish, Viljandi County in Estonia. It has a population of 68 (as of 2009).

The eastern part of the village is occupied by the Parika Bog which also includes several lakes like Parika Väikejärv.

References

Villages in Viljandi County